The Zazzau, also known as the Zaria Emirate, is a traditional state with headquarters in the city of Zaria, Kaduna State, Nigeria. The current emir of Zazzau is H.E Alhaji Ahmed Nuhu Bamalli CFR, who succeeded the former emir, late Alhaji Shehu Idris.

Early Hausa kingdom
The most important source for the early history of Zazzau is a chronicle composed in the early 20th century from an oral tradition.  It tells the traditional story of the foundation of the Hausa kingdoms by the culture hero Bayajidda, and gives a list of rulers along with the length of their reigns.  According to this chronology, the original Hausa or Habe kingdom is said to date from the 11th century, founded by King Gunguma.
This source also makes it one of the seven Hausa Bakwai states.
Zazzau's most famous early ruler was Queen (or princess) Amina, who ruled either in the mid-15th or mid-16th centuries, and was held by Muhammed Bello, an early 19th-century Hausa historian and the second Sultan of Sokoto, to have been the first to establish a kingdom among the Hausa.

Zazzau was a collection point for slaves to be delivered to the northern markets of Kano and Katsina, where they were exchanged for salt with traders who carried them north of the Sahara.
According to the history in the chronicle, Islam was introduced to the kingdom around 1456, but appears to have spread slowly, and pagan rituals continued until the Fulani conquest of 1808.
At several times in its history, Zazzau was subject to neighboring states such as Songhai, Bornu and Kwararafa.

Later Fulani emirate

In December 1808 the kingdom was captured in the Fulani jihad.
The Hausa (Habe) ruler had escaped to Abuja, where he established a state now known as the Suleja Emirate, retaining his independence and the title of "Sarkin Zazzau".
The ruler of the modern Zazzau Emirate also uses the title "Sarkin Zazzau" or "Sarkin Zaria".
After the jihad, the culturally similar but pastoral or nomadic Fulani intermarried with the more settled Habe farmers, and the people of the Emirate today are generally known as Hausa-Fulani.
The government of the Zaria Emirate differed from other emirates created at this time in that offices were rarely hereditary, but were appointed based on merit or obligation.

Rulers

Hausa kingdom

Names and Dates taken from John Stewart's African States and Rulers (1989).

Capitals (c. 1010 – c. 1578): Turunku, Wuciciri, Rikoci, Kawar

The kingdom's name changed to Zaria at the end of the 16th century.

Capital (c. 1578 – 1835): Zaria (originally founded in 1536 and named after Chief Bakwa's daughter Zaria)

Independent Fulani rulers

The kingdom was taken over by the Fulani Empire in 1804 and became an emirate in 1835. The Hausa rulers went into exile and founded Abuja. The emirate was taken by the British in 1902.

Rulers of the independent Fulani emirate:

Colonial period and later rulers

Rulers of the independent Fulani emirate:

External links

References

History of Nigeria
Nigerian traditional states